ICS College of Arts is an interior design college in Meguro, Tokyo, Japan. Established in 1963 with the name interior center school, In 1994 renamed as ICS College of Arts The college was founded by Karasawa Ritsuko.

Faculties 
Interior Design & Architecture Department
Interior Decoration Department
Interior Meister Department
Interior Architecture & Design Department 2
Interior Coordinator Saturday one-year course

Universities and colleges in Tokyo
Educational institutions with year of establishment missing